The 1997–98 Navy Midshipmen men's basketball team represented the United States Naval Academy during the 1997–98 NCAA Division I men's basketball season. The Midshipmen were led by second-year head coach Don DeVoe, and played their home games at Alumni Hall in Annapolis, Maryland as members of the Patriot League.

Roster

Schedule and results

|-
!colspan=9 style=| Regular season

|-
!colspan=9 style=| Patriot League tournament

|-
!colspan=9 style=| NCAA tournament

Source

References

Navy Midshipmen
Navy
Navy Midshipmen men's basketball seasons
Navy
Navy